Stefan Andersson (born in Haga, Gothenburg, Sweden on 8 August 1967) is a Swedish singer-songwriter. Andersson is known for his 1992 Swedish hit song "Catch the Moon", which reached No. 4 on the Swedish charts.

Melodifestivalen
Andersson participated in Melodifestivalen 2007 with Aleena Gibson as Andersson & Gibson, with the song Anything But You. They placed fifth in semi-final round one, but were not chosen to advance to the final round or the second chance round by Swedish audiences.

Discography

Albums

Live albums

Compilation albums
2007 – Det bästa med
2012 – En samlad Stefan 1992–2012	(# 47 Sweden)

Singles

References

External links

Official website
Stefan Andersson on the SVT website

Swedish male singers
Living people
1967 births
Melodifestivalen contestants of 2007
Melodifestivalen contestants of 2006